Kafar Kosh (also Romanized as Kāfar Kosh) is a village in Alamut-e Pain Rural District, Rudbar-e Alamut District, Qazvin County, Qazvin Province, Iran. At the 2006 census, its population was 42, in 15 families.

References

External links

Populated places in Qazvin County